Preston Quick (born March 10, 1978 in Colorado) is a professional male squash player who represented the United States during his career. He reached a career-high world ranking of World No. 97 in January 2003 after having joined the Professional Squash Association in 2000.

His sister, Meredeth Quick, is also a squash player.

External links

References

1978 births
Living people
American male squash players
Pan American Games bronze medalists for the United States
Pan American Games medalists in squash
Squash players at the 2003 Pan American Games
Trinity Bantams men's squash players
Sportspeople from Colorado
Medalists at the 2003 Pan American Games